The Tapini Rural LLG is a local-level government area situated in the Goilala District of the Central Province of Papua New Guinea. In 2000, the LLG had 1,685 households, and a population of 7,315 (3,793 men and 3,522 women). The LLG has a President and a Deputy President, and elections are normally held every five years after the national elections in September.

Wards
The area contains the town of Tapini, and is divided into ten wards:

 53020580 Tapini Urban
 53020501 Ivani
 53020502 Central Ivane
 53020503 Sopu
 53020504 Kerau
 53020505 Kataipa
 53020506 Jowa
 53020507 Loloipa
 53020508 Pilitu 1
 53020509 Pilitu 2

Villages

References

Local-level governments of Central Province (Papua New Guinea)